Mattapony is a former hundred in Worcester County, Maryland.

Mattapony and its various spellings (Mattaponi, Mataponi, Mattapany, Matapani) may also refer to:

Mattaponi, an Algonquian tribe
Mattaponi River, a tributary of the York River estuary in eastern Virginia
Mattaponi, Virginia, an unincorporated community in King and Queen County, Virginia
Mattaponi Wildlife Management Area, a state-managed protected area in Caroline County, Virginia
USS Mattaponi (AO-41), the name of a United States Navy Mattaponi-class oiler 
Mataponi Creek, a tributary of the Patuxent River in Prince George's County, Maryland
Camp Mataponi, an all-girls sleepaway camp in Naples, Maine
Matapani, a settlement in Kenya's Coast Province
Mattapany-Sewall Archeological Site, a registered historic place in St. Mary's County, Maryland
Mattapony Creek, a tributary of the Pocomoke River in Worcester County, Maryland 
Mattaponi (John Bowie Jr. House) is a historic building in Nottingham, Prince George's County, Maryland

See also
Mattapan, Boston